Medha Sharma  is a 1940 Indian Bollywood film.

1940 films
1940s Hindi-language films